The Bigger Than Life Tour was a co- headlining tour by American rock bands, Daughtry and 3 Doors Down. The tour supported Daughtry's third studio album, Break the Spell, and 3 Doors Down's The Greatest Hits album.

Background
The tour was announced on October 8, 2012. Chris Daughtry said, "It's an honor to be able to go on the road with 3 Doors Down. We are excited to give fans an energetic rock show every night sharing songs from both our catalogs...we can't wait to hit the road to share it with our fans." The second leg of the tour  was announced on December 10, 2012, and the third leg on April 23, 2013.

Opening acts
P.O.D. 
Aranda 
Halestorm 
Bad Seed Rising

Set list

Tour dates

Festivals and other miscellaneous performances
This concert is a part of Innsbrook After Hours.
This concert is a part of Freedom Fest at University of Wisconsin – La Crosse

Box office score date

References

2012 concert tours
2013 concert tours
Co-headlining concert tours
Daughtry (band) concert tours
3 Doors Down